Michael Jackson (1958–2009) was an American singer, songwriter and dancer known as the "King of Pop".

Michael Jackson, Mike Jackson, or Mick Jackson may also refer to:

People

Entertainment industry
 Michael Jackson (radio commentator) (1934–2022), American radio talk show host, KABC and KGIL, Los Angeles
 Michael Jackson (writer) (1942–2007), Beer Hunter show host, beer and whisky expert
 Mick Jackson (director) (born 1943), British film and TV director, known for The Bodyguard
 Michael J. Jackson (born 1948), English actor from Liverpool, best known for his role in Brookside
 Michael Jackson (television executive) (born 1958), British television executive
 Mick Jackson (author) (born 1960), British writer, known for The Underground Man
 Mike Jackson (photographer) (born 1966), British abstract and landscape photographer, known for Poppit Sands images
 Michael Jackson (actor) (born 1970), Canadian actor
 Mike Jackson (film producer) (born 1972), American film producer and talent manager
 Michael R. Jackson (born 1981), American playwright, composer, and lyricist

Musicians
 Mike Jackson (musician) (1888–1945), American jazz pianist and composer
 Mike Jackson (Australian entertainer) (born 1946), Australian multi-instrumentalist, songwriter and children's entertainer
 Mick Jackson (singer) (born 1947), English singer-songwriter
 Michael Gregory (jazz guitarist) (born 1953), American jazz guitarist, born Michael Gregory Jackson
 Mike and Michelle Jackson, Australian multi-instrumental duo
 Michael Jackson (English singer) (born 1964), British singer with the heavy metal band Satan/Pariah
 Oh No (musician), birth name Michael Woodrow Jackson (born 1978), American rapper
 Michael Lee Jackson, guitarist
 Mick Jackson, bassist with British band Love Affair (1950-)

Military and militants
 Michael Jackson (American soldier) (1734–1801), soldier from Massachusetts, wounded at Bunker Hill
 Mike Jackson (British Army officer) (born 1944), former head of the British Army
 Salman Raduyev or Michael Jackson (1967–2002), Chechen warlord

Politicians and officials
 Mike Jackson (Texas politician) (born 1953), Republican member of the Texas Senate
 Michael P. Jackson (born 1954), U.S. Deputy Secretary of Homeland Security, 2005–2007
 Michael W. Jackson (born 1963), Alabama District Attorney
 Michael A. Jackson (politician) (born 1964), from Prince George's County, Maryland
 Mike Jackson (Oklahoma politician) (born 1978), member of the Oklahoma House of Representatives

Sportspeople

American football
 Michael Jackson (linebacker) (born 1957), American NFL linebacker (1979–1986)
 Michael Jackson (wide receiver) (1969–2017), American politician and NFL wide receiver
 Mike Jackson Sr. (born 1997), American football cornerback

Association football (soccer)
 Mike Jackson (footballer, born 1939), Scottish footballer and manager
 Michael Jackson (footballer, born 1963) (Mariléia dos Santos), Brazilian women's association footballer
 Mike Jackson (footballer, born 1973), English association football player born in Liverpool
 Michael Jackson (footballer, born 1980), English association football player born in Cheltenham

Other sports
 Mike Jackson (left-handed pitcher) (born 1946), American baseball player
 Mike Jackson (basketball) (born 1949), American ABA pro basketball player (1972–1976)
 Michael Jackson (basketball) (born 1964), American NBA pro basketball player, Sacramento Kings (1987–1990)
 Mike Jackson (right-handed pitcher) (born 1964), American baseball player
 Michael Jackson (rugby league) (born 1969), rugby league footballer for Great Britain, Wakefield Trinity, Halifax
 Mike Jackson (wrestler) (born 1949), American professional wrestler
 Mike Jackson (fighter) (born 1985), American mixed martial artist

Other people
 Michael A. Jackson (computer scientist) (born 1936), developer of software development methods
 Michael Jackson (anthropologist) (born 1940), New Zealand, professor of social anthropology and writer
 Mike Jackson (automotive) (born 1949), former CEO of Mercedes-Benz USA and CEO of AutoNation
 Mike Jackson (systems scientist) (born 1951), British organizational theorist and consultant
 Michael Jackson (murderer) (born 1954), American convicted murderer
 Mike Jackson (retailing) (born 1954), former president and COO of Supervalu
 Michael Jackson (bishop) (born 1956), Church of Ireland Archbishop of Dublin, Ireland, since 2011
 Michael Jackson (journalist), Niuean journalist and former politician
 Michael Jackson, American criminal with Tiffany Cole

Characters
 Mike Jackson (character), a character in the Psmith books by P. G. Wodehouse

Songs
 "Michael Jackson", a song by Cash Cash from The Beat Goes On
 "Michael Jackson", a song by Das Racist from Relax
 "Michael Jackson", a song by Fatboy Slim, B-side of "Going Out of My Head"
 "Michael Jackson", a song by The Mitchell Brothers
 "Michael Jackson", a song by Negativland from Escape from Noise

See also

 
 
 
 Michael L. Jackson (disambiguation)
 Jackson (disambiguation)
 Jackson (name)
 Michael (disambiguation)
 Mitchell Jackson (disambiguation)

Jackson, Michael